Littleton Waller Tazewell (December 17, 1774May 6, 1860) was a Virginia lawyer, plantation owner, and politician who served as U.S. Representative, U.S. Senator and the 26th Governor of Virginia, as well as a member of the Virginia House of Delegates.

Early and family life
Tazewell, son of Henry Tazewell (1753-1799) and his wife Dorothy Elizabeth Waller (1754–77), was born in Williamsburg in the Colony of Virginia shortly before Christmas, 1774. His father was a clerk of the revolutionary conventions during the next two years. Although his mother died when he was a child, his maternal grandfather, lawyer Benjamin Waller, taught him Latin. Tazewell was privately tutored by John Wickham; he later graduated from the College of William and Mary at Williamsburg in 1791. He married Ann Stratton Nivison Tazewell (1785-1858), and they had at least six daughters and two sons, although only four daughters would survive their mother.

Career
After studying law, Tazewell was admitted to the Virginia bar in 1796 and commenced practice in James City County, Virginia. He was a member of the Virginia House of Delegates (a part-time position) representing James City County from 1798 to 1800, when he resigned to fill the vacancy caused by the resignation of John Marshall in the Sixth United States Congress, serving in the federal legislature from November 26, 1800, to March 4, 1801. Politically, Tazewell was a Jeffersonian Republican, and upon the fissure of that party he associated with the Jacksonian Democrats.

Tazewell moved to Norfolk, Virginia in 1802. He represented Norfolk Borough in the General Assemblies of 1804–1805 and 1805–1806 but was replaced by William Newsum, Jr. in the Assembly of 1806-1806. Nonetheless, on July 5, 1807, he defused the impressment crisis involving the British HMS Leopard in Norfolk harbor and the USS Chesapeake and Norfolk mayor Richard E. Lee. Tazewell again represented James City County in the House of Delegates from 1809 until 1812. Norfolk voters elected him to represent the Borough again in the Virginia House of Delegates from 1816 to 1817. After the War of 1812, Tazewell, General Taylor, George Newton, and others also formed the Roanoke Commercial Company, designed to expand traffic through the Dismal Swamp Canal and allow goods from as far away as mountainous Bedford County to ship through Norfolk. Tazewell also served as one of the commissioners of claims under the treaty with Spain, which ceded Florida in 1821.

Virginia legislators elected Tazewell in 1824 to the United States Senate to fill the vacancy caused by the death of John Taylor. Re-elected in 1829, he served from December 7, 1824, to July 16, 1832, when he resigned to become Virginia's governor, as discussed below. While in the Senate, Tazewell was President pro tempore of the Senate during the Twenty-second United States Congress and chairman of the Senate Committee on Foreign Relations. His principal published work is Review of the Negotiations between the United States and Great Britain Respecting the Commerce of the Two Countries (1829).

Tazewell served as Norfolk's delegate to the Virginia Constitutional Convention in 1829–1830.

When the Whigs secured majorities in the Virginia Assembly for six years, they first elected the Old Republican as a Whig governor 1834–36. However, he resigned a year before his term ended. During his two years as governor, Tazewell had to address abolitionism. However, Nat Turner's revolt had occurred in 1831 while Tazewell was home from Washington (and caused him to neglect his plantations). He became an advocate of wholesale colonization and, as Governor, asked Virginia's legislature to formally request that Northern states suppress abolitionist groups and also asked Congress to suppress delivery of such literature through the U.S. Post Office. Tazewell's governorship was also marked by an expansion of the James River Canal, which was to connect to the Kanawha Canal and thus the Ohio River. Under his leadership, the Assembly instructed Virginia's U.S. Senators to support internal improvements, protective tariffs, and a national bank supporting Henry Clay's American System.

Following his term as governor, Tazewell retired from public life but received 11 electoral votes for vice-president in the election of 1840.

Tazewell owned plantations and enslaved persons in the Hampton Roads area. In the 1830 U.S. Federal Census, his Norfolk household included nine free white people (5 his children) and a dozen enslaved people. Although Virginia state slave censuses are not available online, and several federal census returns appear either missing or digitally misindexed, by 1860, his household included nine enslaved people (3 men, 5 women, and one 2-year-old boy) in Norfolk, and over 100 enslaved people across the Chesapeake Bay in Northampton County, Virginia (inherited through his wife).

Death and legacy
Governor Tazewell died a widower in Norfolk, Virginia, on May 6, 1860. Initially interred with his wife on his estate on the Eastern Shore of Virginia, he was re-interred in 1866 at Elmwood Cemetery in Norfolk.

Tazewell, Virginia, Tazewell County, Virginia and Tazewell County, Illinois are named in his honor and his father's honor, as are the cities of Tazewell and New Tazewell, Tennessee. A plaque remembering him stands at the corner of Tazewell and Granby streets in Norfolk, near the Tazewell Hotel and Suites, where his two-story house was located. His house, known as the Boush-Tazewell House, was completely dismantled and re-erected in its present location about three miles from its original site around 1902. It was listed on the National Register of Historic Places in 1974.

Tazewell was the maternal grandfather of Littleton Waller Tazewell Bradford (1848–1918), a prominent Virginia politician and a founder of Pi Kappa Alpha fraternity.

A building at the College of William and Mary is named in Tazewell's honor.

References

External links

 Congressional biography
 Discourse on the Life and Character of the Hon. Littleton Waller Tazewell Hugh Blair Grigsby, Published by J. D. Ghiselin, Norfolk, 1860
 A Guide to the Executive Papers of Governor Littleton W. Tazewell, 1834–1836 at The Library of Virginia

|-

|-

|-

|-

|-

|-

1774 births
1840 United States vice-presidential candidates
1860 deaths
19th-century American politicians
Chairmen of the Senate Committee on Foreign Relations
College of William & Mary alumni
Democratic Party governors of Virginia
Democratic-Republican Party members of the United States House of Representatives from Virginia
Democratic-Republican Party United States senators
Democratic Party (United States) vice presidential nominees
Democratic Party United States senators from Virginia
Democratic Party members of the Virginia House of Delegates
Politicians from Williamsburg, Virginia
Presidents pro tempore of the United States Senate
Virginia lawyers
Virginia Jacksonians
Tazewell family
People from Norfolk, Virginia
People from Williamsburg, Virginia
United States senators who owned slaves